Borkovia is a genus of Cercozoa.

References

Cercozoa genera
Filosa